Belozersky District is the name of several administrative and municipal districts in Russia. The name literally means "pertaining to white lakes".

Modern districts
Belozersky District, Kurgan Oblast, an administrative and municipal district of Kurgan Oblast
Belozersky District, Vologda Oblast, an administrative and municipal district of Vologda Oblast

Historical districts
Belozersky District, Orenburg Oblast, a former district in Orenburg Oblast; merged into Oktyabrsky District in 1965

See also
Belozersky (disambiguation)
Belozersk

References